Everton Felipe de Oliveira Silva (born 28 July 1997), known as Everton Felipe, is a Brazilian professional footballer who plays as an attacking midfielder.

Club career

Sport
Born in Limoeiro, Pernambuco, Everton Felipe joined Sport's youth setup in 2011, aged 13. On 19 January 2014, aged just 16, he made his first-team debut by coming on as a second-half substitute for Rithely in a 1–1 away draw against Botafogo-PB, for the year's Copa do Nordeste.

In May 2014, after the arrival of new manager Eduardo Baptista, Everton Felipe was loaned to Internacional until the end of 2015, and immediately joined the club's under-17 squad. Upon returning from loan, he was assigned to the main squad and renewed his contract until 2020 on 21 January 2016.

Everton Felipe made his Série A debut on 22 May 2016, replacing Reinaldo Lenis in a 1–1 home draw against Botafogo. He scored his first goal in the division on 11 September, netting his team's fifth in a 5–3 home defeat of Santa Cruz. 

On 15 February 2017, Everton Felipe further extended his contract until February 2022. In September, he suffered a severe knee injury, being sidelined for seven months.

São Paulo
On 7 August 2018, Everton Felipe signed a four-year contract with fellow top division side São Paulo FC, for a fee of R$ 6 million for 40% of his federative rights.

Honours
Sport
Copa do Nordeste: 2014
Campeonato Pernambucano: 2014, 2017

 Atlético Goianiense
Campeonato Goiano: 2020

References

External links

1997 births
Living people
Sportspeople from Pernambuco
Brazilian footballers
Association football midfielders
Campeonato Brasileiro Série A players
Sport Club do Recife players
São Paulo FC players
Club Athletico Paranaense players
Cruzeiro Esporte Clube players
Atlético Clube Goianiense players